Sophie Junghans (1845-1907) was a German writer whose works include The American Girl. She was once described as having "an almost manly spirit."

References 

19th-century German women writers
20th-century German women writers
Writers from Kassel
1845 births
1907 deaths